The 1930 Staten Island Stapletons season was their second in the league. The team improved on their previous output of 3–4–3, winning five games. They finished sixth in the league.

Schedule

Standings

References

Staten Island Stapletons seasons
Staten Island Stapletons